Kurt Jaeger (born 25 November 1961) is a Liechtensteiner diplomat who served as Liechtenstein's ambassador to the United States.

Early life

Kurt Jaeger was born on 25 November 1961, to Kurt Julius Jaeger in Grabs, Switzerland. From 1973 to 1979, he attended a Jesuit boarding school in Vienna, Austria, and later attended a high school in Disentis, Switzerland from 1979 to 1980, before graduating from a high school in Vaduz, Liechtenstein in 1982.

From 1982 to 1984, he attended the University of St. Gallen. In 1987, he graduated from the University of Fribourg with a law degree. In 1989, he graduated from McGill University with a Master of Laws degree. He married Laurette and had one son with her, Fabian Jaeger.

Career

After graduating from McGill University he worked for Avtec as legal counsel. In 1990, he joined the Swiss Federal Office for Civil Aviation where he enforced international air transport regulation and later served as the executive assistant and general counsel to the director general in 1994.

In 1996, he worked at a private law practice in Vaduz, Liechtenstein. In 1997, he became the secretary to the board of the directors and general counsel to the CEO of Crossair. In 2000, he became the vice president of Atraxis Management Services and later became the vice president for aeropolitical affairs for Swiss International Air Lines in 2001.

Diplomacy

In 2005, he became a member of the board of the Surveillance Authority (ESA) of the European Free Trade Association representing Liechtenstein.

In 2016, he was appointed to serve as the second ambassador to the United States following the retirement of Claudia Fritsche. He arrived in Washington, D.C. in August and presented his credentials to President Barack Obama on 16 September 2016.

References

1961 births
21st-century Liechtenstein politicians
Ambassadors of Liechtenstein to the United States
Liechtenstein diplomats
Living people
McGill University Faculty of Law alumni
University of Fribourg alumni

External links

 Kurt Jaeger on Twitter